
Gmina Kąty Wrocławskie is an urban-rural gmina (administrative district) in Wrocław County, Lower Silesian Voivodeship, in south-western Poland. It is part of the Wrocław metropolitan area.

Neighbouring gminas
Gmina Kąty Wrocławskie is bordered by the city of Wrocław and by the gminas of Kobierzyce, Kostomłoty, Miękinia, Mietków and Sobótka.

Villages
Apart from the town of Kąty Wrocławskie, the gmina contains the villages of Baranowice, Bliż, Bogdaszowice, Cesarzowice, Czerńczyce, Gądów, Gniechowice, Górzyce, Jaszkotle, Jurczyce, Kamionna, Kębłowice, Kilianów, Kozłów, Krobielowice, Krzeptów, Małkowice, Mokronos Dolny, Mokronos Górny, Nowa Wieś Kącka, Nowa Wieś Wrocławska, Pełcznica, Pietrzykowice, Romnów, Różaniec, Rybnica, Sadków, Sadkówek, Sadowice, Samotwór, Skałka, Smolec, Sokolniki, Sośnica, Stary Dwór, Stoszyce, Stradów, Strzeganowice, Szymanów, Wojtkowice, Wszemiłowice, Zabrodzie, Zachowice and Zybiszów.

Twin towns – sister cities

Gmina Kąty Wrocławskie is twinned with:
 Biblis, Germany
 Mignaloux-Beauvoir, France
 Svitlovodsk Raion, Ukraine
 Żerków, Poland

References

Katy Wroclawskie
Wrocław County